

Active

Defunct

See also
List of academic journals published in Serbia
List of Serbian-language journals

References

Sources

External links

magazines
 
Magazines